Girija Rajya Laxmi Shah, professionally known as Prema Shah (1945–2017) was a Nepali poet, lecturer and short-story writer. She is considered one of the foremost Nepali writer of the twentieth century.

Early life and education 
She was born on 29 June 1945 (16 Ashadh 2002 BS) to father Purnendra Bikram Shah and mother Aruna Shah in Shreepur, Birgunj. On the fourteenth day of her birth, she was taken to her maternal home in Kathmandu, where she grew up. His maternal grandfather Bigyan Shumsher JBR was a General at that time. Prema Shah's childhood and childhood were spent under the care and upbringing of General Rana. She was also involved in the art of singing and dancing since childhood. She was raised by Tulsi Devi Upadhyay Koirala, her nanny.

She was initially homeschooled. After some education at home, she was directly admitted to the sixth grade at Patan High School. After studying at Patan High School for a year, the morning classes of the school was shifted to Madan Memorial School. Then she started going to Madan Memorial School. And then she was admitted to Tri-Padma School in Patan. She was then taken to Adarsh Kanya Niketan in Mangalbazar, Patan. She then graduated from Patan College with a proficiency certificate and a bachelor's degree from Tribhuvan University. She also received a diploma in Batik painting from Banaras Hindu University. She also studied ceramics in Benaras.

Notable works 
List of works by Prema Shah:

Short story collections 

 Pahenlo Gulaph (Yellow Rose, 1966)
 Vishayantara (Digressions, 1971)

Novels 

 Aakash Bibhajit Chha (Co-writer)
 Mummy

Children's literature

Children's story collections 

 Jinki ra Joker
 Mantu Bajaiko Kathako Patero
 Indra Dhanush
 Rangi Changi Kathaharu
 Ramro Kaam
 Reka Kehi Katha

Children's novels 

 Rameko Katha
 Anandako Aavishkar
 Manu ra Bhangera

Editing 

 Ujyalo (Children's magazine)

Personal life and death 
She married JP Shahi, an Indian landowner on 2 July 1971 (18 Ashadh 2028). After marriage she moved to Benaras to study. After returning to Nepal, they got divorced. She then moved to Japan to study art. After returning from Japan she married RM Karmacharya in Guhyeshwari Temple. After one year of marriage, a daughter was born. Karmacaharya and Shah divorced after some time.

She died at the age of 72 on 20 December 2017 (5 Poush 2074 BS) in Inter Mountain Hospital of Salt Lake City, Utah. Her daughter Jal Shah is a prominent Nepali actress.

See also 

 Banira Giri
 Parijat
 Dev Kumari Thapa

References 

1945 births
People from Birgunj
2017 deaths
20th-century Nepalese women writers
20th-century Nepalese poets
Nepali-language poets
Nepali-language writers from Nepal
Nepalese short story writers
Nepalese children's writers
Nepalese novelists
Nepalese women poets